Gal Maria da Graça Costa Penna Burgos (born Maria da Graça Costa Penna Burgos; 26 September 1945 – 9 November 2022), known professionally as Gal Costa, was a Brazilian singer of popular music. She was one of the main figures of the tropicalia music scene in Brazil in the late 1960s and appeared on the acclaimed compilation Tropicália: ou Panis et Circenses (1968).

Early life

Gal Costa was born on 26 September 1945, in the city of Salvador, the capital of the state of Bahia, Brazil. Her mother, Mariah Costa Penna, spent hours listening to classical music during her pregnancy in hopes that Gal would be interested in music. Gal's father, Arnaldo Burgos (deceased 1960), died when Gal was 15 years old, and the two never met.

At the age of 10, Gal befriended sisters Sandra and Andréia Gadelha, the future spouses of singer-songwriters Gilberto Gil and Caetano Veloso, respectively. These gave her the nickname Gau, later spelled as Gal. At 14, she first listened to João Gilberto's "Chega de Saudade" on the radio and became interested in Bossa Nova. She then went on to work as a clerk in Salvador's main record store to get closer to music. At 18, she was introduced to Caetano Veloso by Andréia Gadelha, becoming close friends.

Career

Gal debuted her professional career on the night of 22 August 1964 at the concert Nós, por exemplo (We, For Example), where she performed alongside Veloso, Gil, Maria Bethânia and Tom Zé, among others. The concert inaugurated the Vila Velha Theatre in her hometown. During the same year, she also performed in Nova Bossa Velha, Velha Bossa Nova (New Old Wave, Old New Wave), at the same place and with the same singing partners. She then left Salvador to live in the house of her cousin Nívea in Rio de Janeiro, following in the footsteps of Bethânia, whose concert Opinião (Opinion) had become a huge hit there.

Gal's first professional recording happened on Bethânia's debut album, released in 1965. It was the duet "Sol Negro" (Black Sun) written by Bethânia's brother, Caetano Veloso. She then released her first singles through RCA Records, "Eu vim da Bahia", written by Gil, and "Sim, foi você", written by Veloso. The following year Gal met Gilberto personally and participated in TV Rio's 1st International Music Festival performing "Minha Senhora", written by Gil and Torquato Neto. It failed to captivate the Festival's audience.

Gal's first album Domingo was released in 1967 through Philips Records. It was also Veloso's debut. Gal stayed on the label, which later became PolyGram, until 1983. One song released from this album, "Coração Vagabundo", became a huge hit. The same year, Gal also performed two songs on the 2nd International Music Festival, which was then hosted by Rede Globo. They were "Bom Dia", written by Gil and Nana Caymmi, and "Dadá Maria", written by Renato Teixeira. The latter was performed with Sílvio César at the Festival and with Teixeira on the recording.

In 1965, Costa began to record inedited songs from Gilberto Gil and Caetano Veloso. In 1968, Gal became a part of the tropicália movement. Tropicalia is a mix of Samba, Bossa Nova and modern genres like rock and beat. She recorded four songs on Tropicália: ou Panis et Circenses. They were "Mamãe coragem", written by Veloso and Torquato Neto, "Parque industrial", by Tom Zé, "Enquanto seu lobo não vem", by Veloso, and "Baby", also by Veloso. The latter became one of Costas best known songs. The same year, she participated in the 3rd International Music Festival, performing "Gabriela Mais Bela", written by Roberto and Erasmo Carlos. In November, she participated in Rede Record's 4th Music Festival, performing the song "Divino Maravilhoso", by Gil and Veloso. The song also became a nationwide hit and a classic song of popular music. When Gilberto Gil and Caetano Veloso were living in exile in London, she would visit them and keep performing their music, but stayed in Brazil.

In 1969, Gal released her eponymous solo debut album, which included "Baby" and "Divino Maravilhoso". The album is considered a Tropicalismo classic, balanced between Brazilian stylizations and North American psychedelic influences. It also featured Gal's third and fourth solo hits, Jorge Ben Jor's "Que pena (Ele já não gosta mais de mim)" and Veloso's "Não identificado", respectively. In the same year, she recorded her second solo album, titled Gal, and featuring the hits "Meu nome é Gal", by Roberto and Erasmo Carlos, and "Cinema Olympia", by Veloso. The album served as the basis for the repertoire of the concert Gal!

Her next album, Legal, was not as far from the mainstream as its predecessor, and a live album the following year again balanced smooth Brazilian sounds with heavy rock. In 1973, the cover of Costa's album Índia was censored — it focuses on her red bikini bottom. Gal has recorded songs composed by a number of Brazil's most popular songwriters such as Tom Jobim, Ben and Erasmo Carlos. In the 1970s, she was one of the integrants of the Doces Bárbaros, the others being Veloso, Gil and Maria Bethânia. For years a reunion was hoped for this emblematic group in the Brazilian popular music. In 1982 the single "Festa Do Interior" from the double album Fantasia became her biggest ever hit, going multi-platinum by the end of the year. In 1994, Gal performed the song Brasil, topless. Gal appeared in the 1995 film The Mandarin (O Mandarim) as the singer Carmen Miranda. She recorded songs in Portuguese, Spanish and English.

Gal Costa is portrayed by Sophie Charlotte in the 2023 biographical film Meu nome é Gal.

Awards 
2011 Latin Grammy Lifetime Achievement Award

Personal life
Gal was bisexual. She dated singer Marina Lima in the 1990s.

Death
Gal died in São Paulo on 9 November 2022, at the age of 77.  She was recovering from an extraction of a nodule of her nasal cavity and had canceled her show at the Primavera Sound.

Discography

Studio albums

Live albums
1971: -Fa-Tal- Gal a Todo Vapor
1976: Doces Bárbaros (with Caetano Veloso, Gilberto Gil, and Maria Bethânia)
1986: Jazzvisions: Rio Revisited (with Antonio Carlos Jobim)
1997: Acústico MTV
1999: Gal Costa Canta Tom Jobim Ao Vivo
2006: Gal Costa Live at the Blue Note
2006: Gal Costa Ao Vivo
2013: Recanto Ao Vivo

Singles
1968: "Baby" 
1969: "Que Pena (Ela Já Não Gosta Mais De Mim)"
1970: "Meu Nome É Gal"
1970: "London, London"

Selected filmography

References

Bibliography
 De Stefano, Gildo, Il popolo del samba, La vicenda e i protagonisti della storia della musica popolare brasiliana, Preface by Chico Buarque de Hollanda, Introduction by Gianni Minà, RAI-ERI, Rome 2005, 
 De Stefano, Gildo, Saudade Bossa Nova: musiche, contaminazioni e ritmi del Brasile, Preface by Chico Buarque, Introduction by Gianni Minà, Logisma Editore, Firenze 2017,

External links
  
  
 
 
 
 Gal Costa at Slipcue.com – English-language discography with reviews
 Gal Costa at kellerjazz.com – photo collection

1945 births
2022 deaths
Brazilian mezzo-sopranos
Bossa nova singers
Música Popular Brasileira singers
Tropicália
People from Salvador, Bahia
Wrasse Records artists
20th-century Brazilian women singers
21st-century Brazilian women singers
Brazilian bisexual people
Recipients of the Order of Cultural Merit (Brazil)
Women in Latin music
Bisexual singers
Bisexual women
20th-century Brazilian LGBT people
21st-century Brazilian LGBT people
Brazilian LGBT singers
LGBT people in Latin music